"Let's Get It Up" is a song by Australian hard rock band AC/DC, first released on their 1981 album For Those About to Rock We Salute You, and later as its first single.

Singer Brian Johnson summarised the track to Kerrang!'''s Sylvie Simmons as "Filth, pure filth. We're a filthy band."

Live versions of "Back in Black" and "T.N.T.", released as B-sides on the UK's version of the single, were both recorded in Landover, Maryland, in December 1981. "T.N.T." only appeared on the 12-inch edition.

Reception
When reviewing the song in the context of For Those About to Rock, Kurt Loder wrote: "It may seem difficult to take a droolflecked runt dressed in schoolboy shorts seriously as a guitarist, but if you listen closely to Angus Young's serpentine solo in 'Let's Get It Up', you'll hear his unabashed blues roots shining through."Record World called it a "cracking rocker with its celebratory chorus."

Chart positions

Single track listing
"Let's Get It Up" – 3:56
"Back in Black" (Recorded live Friday, December 4th, 1981) – 4:01
"T.N.T." (Recorded live Friday, December 4th, 1981) – 3:55
"Love Hungry Man (Recorded live Friday, December 4th, 1981) - 4:52
"Shoot to Thrill" (Recorded live Friday, December 4th, 1981) - 5:45
"Snowballed" - 3:23
"Night Prowler" (Recorded live Friday, December 4th, 1981) - 7:00

References

AC/DC songs
Song recordings produced by Robert John "Mutt" Lange
Songs written by Angus Young
Songs written by Brian Johnson
Songs written by Malcolm Young
Hard rock songs
Blues rock songs
1981 songs
1982 singles
Atlantic Records singles